Giuseppe Sandri (26 August 1946 – 30 May 2019) was an Italian-South African Roman Catholic bishop.

Sandri was born in Italy and was ordained to the priesthood. He served as bishop of the Roman Catholic Diocese of Witbank, South Africa from 2009 unil his death in 2019.

Notes

1946 births
2019 deaths
Italian Roman Catholic bishops in Africa
21st-century Roman Catholic bishops in South Africa
Roman Catholic bishops of Witbank